The National Geographic documentary programme Seconds From Disaster investigates historically relevant man-made and natural disasters from the 20th century. Each episode aims to explain a single incident by analyzing the causes and circumstances that ultimately affected the disaster. The program uses re-enactments, interviews, testimonies, and CGI to analyze the sequence of events second-by-second for the audience. National Geographic has broadcast many of the programme's episodes under multiple titles. The title currently or most recently listed on the NGC Calendar is shown first. Alternate titles are shown in parentheses.

Series overview

Season 1 (2004)

Season 2 (2005–2006)

Season 3 (2006–2007)

{{Episode table
|background=#FDD700 |overall= |season= |title= |aux1= 
|aux2= |aux3= 
|airdate= |aux1T=Disaster |aux2T=Date of disaster |aux3T=Nature of disaster |episodes=

{{Episode list
 |EpisodeNumber   = 44
 |EpisodeNumber2  = 12
 |Title           = Space Shuttle Explosion
 |RAltTitle       = ("Space Shuttle Challenger")
 |Aux1            = Space Shuttle Challenger disaster
 |Aux2            = January 28, 1986
 |Aux3            = Space Shuttle disintegration
 |OriginalAirDate = 
 |ShortSummary    = Space Shuttle Challenger blasts off from Cape Canaveral to start the STS-51-L mission. 73 seconds later, Challenger'''s boosters explode and send it into the ocean in pieces. All seven astronauts on board are killed.
 |LineColor       = FDD700
}}

}}

Season 4 (2011)

Season 5 (2012)

Season 6 (2012)
Season 6 of Seconds From Disaster'' premiered on the one-year anniversary of the 2011 Norway attacks (July 22, 2012). The episode was promoted as a one-off special. The other nine episodes aired from November 5, 2012 in Australia with the episode "Jonestown Cult Suicide".

Season 7 (2018)
Episode 1, "Chopper Down", aired on 15 February 2018 at 8pm on National Geographic UK, while Episode 2 aired on 22 February with the title "Deadly Design".

References

External links
 Seconds From Disaster episodes

Lists of American non-fiction television series episodes